Nizhegorodov is a Russian masculine surname, its feminine counterpart is Nizhegorodova. It may refer to
Denis Nizhegorodov (born 1980), Russian race walker
Gennadiy Nizhegorodov (born 1977), Russian football player
Vladimir Nizhegorodov, Russian 1981 World Rowing Championships gold medallist

Russian-language surnames